Pistocchi is an Italian surname. Notable people with the surname include:

 Francesco Antonio Pistocchi (1659–1726), Italian musician
 Giuseppe Pistocchi (1744–1814), Italian architect

Italian-language surnames